James R. Quirk (September 4, 1884 – August 1, 1932)  was an American magazine editor.

Career
Quirk was the vice president and editor of Photoplay magazine, one of the earliest film or fan glamour magazines and particularly popular in the silent film era. Quirk had been with the magazine since its founding in 1911. Quirk's magazine had many popular rivals such as Motion Picture Magazine, Modern Screen, Classic Screen, Screenland, Movie Story, Screen Book, Silver Screen, Moving Picture Stories, Theatre Magazine, Screen Play, Screen Guide etc.

Quirk had also been editor of the first Washington Times prior to his involvement with Photoplay and editor of the periodical Popular Mechanics during his involvement with Photoplay. For two years (1928–30) he was publisher of The Smart Set magazine.

He was the uncle of Lawrence J. Quirk who gave out an annual award in James's memory that covered many aspects of the film business.

Personal
Quirk was of Irish descent. He was married to Elizabeth North with whom he had 3 children, Frances, Jean, and James (died as infant). Quirk was the second husband of film star May Allison from 1926 until his death in 1932.Looking for Mabel page and bio on Quirk's second wife May Allison, with photo of Quirk

Death
Quirk died August 1, 1932, of bronchial pneumonia and heart disease. He was memorialized in the October 1932 Photoplay''. He had also been a hard drinker. He is buried at Kensico Cemetery, Valhalla, New York. The cemetery is last resting place to many famous Broadway and film celebrities.

References

External links

1884 births
1932 deaths
American magazine editors
American magazine founders
American publishers (people)
American people of Irish descent
People from Boston